

Events
Francx reys Frances, per cuy son Angevi written by Joan Esteve to Philip III of France after the French defeat in the Battle of Les Formigues and the capture of the French admiral Guilhem de Lodeva

Births

Deaths
 Sharaf al-Din Harun Juvayni

13th-century poetry
Poetry